The 1927 U.S. National Championships (now known as the US Open) was a tennis tournament that took place on the outdoor grass courts at the West Side Tennis Club, Forest Hills in New York City, United States. The women's tournament was held from August 22 until August 30 while the men's tournament ran from 12 September until 17 September. It was the 47th staging of the U.S. National Championships and the fourth Grand Slam tennis event of the year. This edition saw the introduction of seedings in the draw which were meant to prevent the best players from meeting each other in the early rounds of the tournament.

Champions

Men's singles

 René Lacoste defeated  Bill Tilden  11–9, 6–3, 11–9

Women's singles

 Helen Wills defeated  Betty Nuthall  6–1, 6–4

Men's doubles
 Bill Tilden /  Frank Hunter defeated  Bill Johnston /  R. Norris Williams  10–8, 6–3, 6–3

Women's doubles

 Kitty McKane Godfree /  Ermyntrude Harvey defeated  Betty Nuthall /  Joan Fry 6–1, 4–6, 6–4

Mixed doubles
 Eileen Bennett /  Henri Cochet defeated  Hazel Hotchkiss Wightman /  René Lacoste 6–2, 0–6, 6–3

References

External links
Official US Open website

 
U.S. National Championships
U.S. National Championships (tennis) by year
U.S. National Championships
U.S. National Championships
U.S. National Championships
U.S. National Championships